The legislative districts of the Philippines are the divisions of the Philippines' provinces and cities for representation in the various legislative bodies. Congressional districts are for House of Representatives, while there are districts for Sangguniang Panlalawigan, and some Sangguniang Panlungsod. For purposes of representation, the Senate, most Sangguniang Panlungsod, Sangguniang Bayan, Sangguniang Barangay and Sangguniang Kabataan are all elected at-large, although there were districts for the Senate from 1916 to 1935.

The first composition of legislative districts was enshrined in the Ordinance appended to the Constitution. Changes in the composition of legislative districts were later added as new provinces and cities were created, and the composition was modified through laws enacted by Congress.

Apportionment on local legislatures is also possible.

History 
Representation to the legislature traces its origin to the Spanish era, when the Philippines was granted very limited representation to the Spanish Cortes. During the American period, when the Philippine Bill of 1902 was enacted, the first Philippine Assembly was established as the lower house and the then-existing Philippine Commission as the upper house. Representation in the assembly was apportioned among the provinces with respect to their population, provided that no province shall have less than one member.

In 1916, the Philippine Legislature was reconstituted with a Senate as the upper house and the Assembly retained as the lower house. The Senate elected members through Senatorial Districts, a grouping of provinces and areas of the country, while the Assembly retained its way of representation. During the Commonwealth period, the Philippine Legislature was abolished, and a unicameral National Assembly was established, with representation being like that of the Philippine Assembly, each province having at least one member depending on its population.

With the passage of the 1940 Amendments to the 1935 Constitution, a bicameral Congress was established with a House of Representatives and a Senate. The House of Representatives way of representation was like that of the Philippine Assembly, while the Senate's members were elected at large.

With the coming of the Interim Batasang Pambansa and the regular Batasan during the Marcos regime, representation was done in many ways: most members were elected by regions, some by appointment from the different sectors of the society such as youth and labor, and some were members of the Cabinet appointed by the President. However, with the advent of the 1987 Constitution, the Batasan was scrapped and the Congress was restored. The present way of electing delegates to the House of Representatives is through legislative districts apportioned among the provinces, cities and the Metropolitan Manila Area and through a party-list system of registered national, regional and sectoral parties or organizations.

Senatorial districts 

From 1916 to 1935, the Philippines was divided into 12 senatorial districts. Each district except for the twelfth senatorial district elected two senators to the Senate. The senators from 12th senatorial district were appointed by the U.S. Governor-General. Since 1941, when the Senate was restored, all twenty-four senators have been elected at-large in intervals.

Congressional districts 

;

Local districts 
As per the Bangsamoro Organic Law, representation in the Bangsamoro Parliament is based from its own parliamentary districts which is distinct from the congressional districts used to determine representation in the national House of Representatives. However the exact delimitation is yet to be determined and the current composition of the parliament which is interim in nature and all members are appointed by the President.

Representation via provincial boards, known as Sangguniang Panlalawigan are also via congressional districts except for a few instances, such as Bulacan's 4th provincial board district includes San Jose del Monte, while its congressional district does not. The province's income determines how many seats it is entitled to, with 6 seats being the least. If a province only has one congressional district, the Commission on Elections then divides the province into two districts based on population and geography.

If a city is split into several congressional districts, representation via its city councils, known as Sangguniang Panlungsod, follows the districts as set by the congressional districts; otherwise, representation is via an at-large district.

At-large representation is also used in municipalities through their Sangguniang Bayan (except in Pateros, where it is split into two districts), and in barangays through their Sangguniang Barangay and Sangguniang Kabataan. At-large representation is always via plurality-at-large voting

See also 
 Administrative divisions of the Philippines
 Congress of the Philippines
 Senate of the Philippines
 House of Representatives of the Philippines

References 

 
Subdivisions of the Philippines
House of Representatives of the Philippines